The different slow motion solo form training sequences of t'ai chi ch'uan are the best known manifestation of t'ai chi for the general public. In English, they are usually called the hand form or just the form;  in Mandarin it is usually called ch'uan.

They are performed slowly by beginners and are said to promote concentration, condition the body and acquaint students with the inventory of motion techniques for more advanced styles of martial arts training. There are also solo weapons forms, as well as much shorter and repetitive sequences to train power generation leverages as a form of qigong (ch'i kung). The various forms of Wu-style pushing hands have two person drill routines as well, which fulfil some of the same functions as the power generation drills.

In 1914 Xu Yusheng established the Athletic Research Institute in Beijing and Invited Yang Shaohou, Yang Chengfu  and Wu Jianquan to teach. From then on t'ai chi was taught to the public changing the ancient closed door policy where t'ai chi was only taught privately to very close and well known people within a limited circle known as the tutor disciple relationship.

Grand Master Wu Jianquan revised and enriched the art of t'ai chi ch'uan handed down from his father Wu Quanyou. His development of the slow set led to the creation of the style of t'ai chi today known as Wu-style t'ai chi ch'uan . He omitted some of the repetitions, fa jin, stamping and jumping movements to make the form smoother, more structured with continuous steady movements. This form promoted the health aspects of Tai Chi and was more suitable for general practitioners though it still contained all the martial applications and training.

Yang Chengfu of Yang-style t'ai chi ch'uan also modified his own Yang style in a similar way at the same time. His brother, Yang Shouhou's form had a high frame with lively steps alternating between fast and slow movements with hard and crisp fa-jin. Chen Panling, who was a student of Yang Shaohou and Wu Jianquan describes t'ai chi form practice beginning with slow movement changing to fast and returning to slow movement. He also points out learning to exercise rapid movement in the form and training from soft to hard and hard to soft movements.

The Shanghai Wu-style Fast Form kept the original fa-jin (release of power), jumping, attacking and stamping movements to be studied by those eager to advance their t'ai chi practice. This advanced form was not yet taught openly.

In December 1982 there was a  martial arts meeting held in Beijing to foster the traditional martial arts of China. Wu Yinghua and Ma Yueliang of The Shanghai Jianquan Taijiquan Association contributed to this effort by disclosing the original Wu-style Fast Set for the first time to the public. In 1983 their adopted daughter Shi Mei Lin demonstrated the Wu-style T'ai Chi Fast Form at the All China Traditional Martial Arts competition in Nanchang where she received the Award of Excellence.

Other Wu-style fast forms

The Wu family's Hong Kong branch also teaches a somewhat different fast form.

Shanghai Wu-style fast form list

The following list is an English translation from Chinese of the empty hand or fist form list published in Ma Yueliang's, Wu Yinghua's and Shi Mei Lin's Wu-style T'ai chi Fast Form. (Note: Traditionally this set consists of 108 forms. For transcribing purposes some of the repeated forms are given one reference number in both the Chinese and English versions of the Wu-style Fast Form book.)

The postures of the Wu fast form style of t'ai chi ch'uan are listed below.

1. Yù Bèi Shì, Preparation

2. Tài Jí Chū Shǒu, Beginning of the Form

3. Lăn Què Wěi, Grasp the bird's tail

4. Dān Biān, Single whip

5. Tí Shŏu Shàng Shì, Raise hand and step up

6. Bái Hè Lìang Chì, White crane flaps its wings

7. Lóu Xī Ào Bù, Brush knee, twist step(1)

8. Brush knee, twist step(2)

9. Brush knee, twist step(3)

10. Brush knee, twist step(4)

11. Shŏu Huī Pí Pa, Hand strums the lute

12. Jìn Bù Bān Lán Chuí, Step up, diverting and blocking fist

13. Rú Fēng Sì Bì, As if closing up

14. Bào Hŭ Tuī Shān, Tiger and leopard spring to the mountain

15. Shí Zi Shŏu, The cross hands

16. Xié Lóu Xī Ào Bù, Oblique brush knee, twist step

17. Fān Shēn Xié Lóu Xī Ào Bù, Turn body, oblique brush knee, twist step

18. Lăn Què Wěi, Grasping the bird's tail

19. Xié Dān Biān, Oblique single whip

20. Zhŏu Dĭ Kàn Chuí, One fist under the elbow, one fist visible

21. Dào Niăn Hóu, Step back and repulse the monkey

22. Xié Fēi Shì, Flying oblique

23. Tí Shŏu Shàng Shì, Raise hands and step up

24. Bái Hè Lìang Chì, White crane flaps its wings

25. Lóu Xī Ào Bù, Brush knee and twist step

26. Hăi Dĭ Zhēn, Needle at the sea bottom

27. Shàn Tōng Bèi, Fan through the back

28. Fān Shēn Piē Shēn Chuí, Turn body, parry and punch

29. Xié Bù Bān Lán Chuí, Step back, diverting and blocking punch

30. Shàng Bù Lăn Què Wěi, Step up, grasping the bird's tail

31. Yún Shŏu (yī), Cloud hands(1)

32. Yún Shŏu (èr), Cloud hands(2)

33. Gāo Tàn Mă, High pat on horse

34. Pī Shēn Tī Jiǎo (yī), Open body and kick (1)

35. Pī Shēn Tī Jiǎo (èr), Open body and kick (2)

36. Zhuăn Shēn Dēng Jiăo, Turn body, pedaling foot

37. Jìn Bù Zāi Chuí, Step up, planting punch

38. Fān Shēn Piē Shēn Chuí, Turn body, parry and punch

39. Fān Shēn Èr Qǐ Jiăo, Double kicking, turn the body

40. Tuì Bù Dă Hŭ, Retreat step, beat the tiger

41. Yòu Dēng Jiăo, Right parting leg

42. Shuāng Fēng Guàn Ĕr, Strike the ears with both fists

43. Pī Shēn Tī Jiăo, Open body, kick

44. Zhuǎn Shēn Dēng Jiăo, Turn body, pedaling foot

45. Shàng Bù Bān Lán Chuí, Step up, diverting and blocking fist

46. Rú Fēng Sì Bì, As if closing up

47. Bào Hŭ Tuī Shān, Tiger and leopard spring to the mountain

48. Shí Zi Shŏu, The cross hands

49. Xié Lóu Xī Ào Bù, Oblique brush knee, twist step

50. Fān Shēn Xié Lóu Xī Ào Bù, Turn body, oblique brush knee, twist step

51. Lăn Què Wěi, Grasping the bird's tail

52. Xié Dān Biān, Oblique single whip

53. Yié Mă Fēn Zōng, Parting wild horse's mane(1)

54. Parting wild horse's mane(2)

55. Parting wild horse's mane(3)

56. Yù Nü Chuān Suō, Jade girl works the shuttles(1)

57. Jade girl works the shuttles(2)

58. Yié Mă Fēn Zōng, Parting the wild horse's mane

59. Yù Nü Chuān Suō, Jade girl works the shuttles(3)

60. Jade girl works the shuttles(4)

61. Lăn Què Wěi, Grasping the bird's tail

62. Yún Shŏu, Cloud hands

63. Xià Shì, Downward posture

64. Jīn Jī Dú Lì, Golden cockerel stands on one leg(1)

65. Golden cockerel stands on one leg(2)

66. Dào Niăn Hóu, Step back, repulse the monkey

67. Xié Fēi Shì, Flying oblique

68. Tí Shŏu Shàng Shì, Raise hand and step up

69. Bái Hè Lìang Chì, White crane flaps its wings

70. Lóu Xī Ào Bù, Brush knee and twist step

71. Hăi Dĭ Zhēn, Needle at the bottom of the sea

72. Shàn Tōng Bèi, Fan through the back

73. Piē Shēn Chuí, Turn body, parry and punch

74. Shàng Bù Bān Lán Chuí, Step up, diverting and blocking punch

75. Lăn Què Wěi, Grasping the bird's tail

76. Yún Shŏu, Cloud hands

77. Gāo Tàn Mă, High pat the horse

78. Yíng Miàn Zhăng, Palm goes to meet the face

79. Shí Zi Băi Lián, Turn body, cross swing lotus

80. Lóu Xī Ào Bù, Brush knee, twist step

81. Zhĭ Dāng Chuí, Punch to groin

82. Lăn Què Wěi, Grasping the bird's tail

83. Xià Shì, Downward posture

84. Shàng Bù Qī Xīng, Step Up to form seven stars

85. Tuì Bù Kuà Hŭ, Retreat step, ride the tiger

86. Zhuăn Shēn Pū Miàn Zhăng, Turn body, palm meets face

87. Fān Shēn Shuāng Băi Lián, Turn body, double lotus swing

88. Wān Gōng Shè Hŭ, Draw bow, shoot the tiger

89. Shàng Bù Cuō Chuí, Step up and pound down

90. Yíng Miàn Zhăng, Palm goes to meet the face

91. Fān Shēn Piē Shēn Chuí, Turn body, parry and punch

92. Jìn Bù Lăn Què Wěi, Step up, grasping the bird's tail

93. Dān Biān, Like single whip

94. Hé Tài Jí, Closing T'ai Chi

See also
108-form Wu family tai chi chuan

References

 Wu Ying Hua, Ma Yueh Liang, Shi Mei Lin (1987). Wu-style T'ai chi Fast Form. Henan Science Skills Ltd. Henan (only available in Chinese) /G122.
 Wu Ying Hua, Ma Yueh Liang, Shi Mei Lin (1991). Wu-style T'ai chi Fast Form. Shanghai Book Co Ltd, Hong Kong (only available in Chinese) . .
 Wu Ying Hua, Ma Yueh Liang(1991). Wu Style Tai Chi Chuan Forms, Concepts and Application of the Original Style. Shanghai Book Co Ltd, Hong Kong. .
 Ma Yueh Liang & Zee Wen(1986, 1990, 1995). Wu Style Tai Chi Chuan Push Hands. Shanghai Book Co Ltd, Hong Kong. .
 Dr Wen Zee (2002) Wu Style Tai Chi Chuan, Ancient Chinese way to health. North Atlantic Books. .
 Chen Pan Ling (1963, 1998) Chen Pan-Ling's Original Tai Chi Chuan Textbook. Blitz .
 Fu Zhong Wen (1963,1999) Mastering Yang Style Taijiquan, Translated by Louis Swaim. North Atlantic Books .

External links
 .
 .
 .
 .
 .
 .
 .
 .
 .
 .
 Forum for Traditional Wu Tai Chi Chuan
 Wu Style T'ai Chi Fast Set (English Translation)
 T'ai Chi Magazine February 2003 No 1 Editor's notes
 Article on Shanghai Wu Style T'ai Chi taught by Ma Jiang Bao in Europe

Tai chi styles
Neijia